Ali Mohammed Al-Zenkawi (born 27 February 1984) is a male hammer thrower from Kuwait. His personal best throw is 79.74 metres, achieved in September 2009 in Celje.

International competitions

References

External links
 

1984 births
Living people
Kuwaiti male hammer throwers
Athletes (track and field) at the 2004 Summer Olympics
Athletes (track and field) at the 2008 Summer Olympics
Athletes (track and field) at the 2012 Summer Olympics
Olympic athletes of Kuwait
Asian Games medalists in athletics (track and field)
Athletes (track and field) at the 2006 Asian Games
Athletes (track and field) at the 2010 Asian Games
Athletes (track and field) at the 2014 Asian Games
World Athletics Championships athletes for Kuwait
Asian Games silver medalists for Kuwait
Medalists at the 2006 Asian Games
20th-century Kuwaiti people
21st-century Kuwaiti people